Happy Feet is an action-adventure game based on the comedy movie of the same name. It was released in 2006 by Midway (publisher) and A2M (developer) for the PlayStation 2, GameCube, Game Boy Advance, Nintendo DS, Wii, and Microsoft Windows. Elijah Wood, Brittany Murphy, Elizabeth Daily, Dee Bradley Baker, and Carlos Alazraqui all reprise their voice roles from the film.

Gameplay 
The console versions (for PlayStation 2, GameCube, Wii, and Microsoft Windows) feature three different modes: a dancing mode which simulates Dance Dance Revolution with the player pushing the button in response to arrows on the screen, a fishing mode in which the player collects pebbles and shrimp as well as air bubbles in order to breathe, and a belly-sledding mode where the player sleds and collects the number of fish needed, sleds to beat a given time or races another character down the hill. In the Nintendo DS version of the game, the rhythm sequences use gameplay mechanics similar to those in Elite Beat Agents, though greatly simplified.

The game also features each of these modes for two players. In the dancing and swimming games, the players compete with each other, while cooperating with each other in the multi-player belly-sledding mode.  The game features songs not in the film, such as "Shake Your Booty" from KC and the Sunshine Band for when Mumble hatches, and "I Will Survive" from Gloria Gaynor sung by Gloria when Mumble and her break up.  These are for the dance modes of the game.

The Game Boy Advance release is significantly different from the console and DS versions; it is primarily a 2D platformer, where Mumble will traverse set levels, usually to perform one task or another for the various characters on the level. Most levels feature a rhythm game, usually playing a song from the film's soundtrack. Other levels are interspaced with smaller minigames, such as sledding or diving for fish, and are required to progress.

Reception 

The PC version of the game received moderate to poor ratings. The GameCube, PS2, Wii, and DS versions got mixed ratings. The Game Boy Advance version got mixed to positive ratings.

References 

2006 video games
Action-adventure games
Midway video games
Game Boy Advance games
GameCube games
Nintendo DS games
Wii games
PlayStation 2 games
Windows games
Video games based on films
Video games developed in Canada
Music video games
Video games scored by Alexander Brandon
Behaviour Interactive games
Multiplayer and single-player video games
Video games using Havok
Video games about birds